Beugin is a commune in the Pas-de-Calais department in the Hauts-de-France region in northern France.

Geography

Population

Sights
 The church of St. Remi, dating from the nineteenth century.
 An artificial lake with pink sandstone cliffs.

See also
Communes of the Pas-de-Calais department

References

Communes of Pas-de-Calais